The Seventy-fourth Oregon Legislative Assembly was the Oregon Legislative Assembly (OLA)'s period from 2007 to 2008. (The Legislative Assembly is the legislative body of the U.S. state of Oregon, composed of the Oregon State Senate and the Oregon House of Representatives.) There was a regular session in 2007, and a shorter special session in 2008.

The 74th was the first Oregon legislature since 1989 in which both its houses were controlled by the Democratic Party of Oregon, which won a one-seat majority in the House in the 2006 elections. (Democrats had previously taken control of the Senate in 2004, and retained it in the 2006 elections.) Democrats took credit for addressing a number of issues, and for adjourning a day before a self-imposed deadline (and before Independence Day, for the first time since 1995). Republican legislators, however, noted that there were no tax reforms to accompany the $15.1 billion (21%) increases in spending over the prior two-year budget. Democratic Governor Ted Kulongoski did not veto any bills during the session, and expressed general approval of the session. In August, after the session's conclusion, he did veto one bill which would have allocated $4.6 million in Portland General Electric ratepayers' fees to pay off a loan on behalf of the Oregon Museum of Science and Industry.

The Statesman Journal praised Kulongoski for being more engaged with the legislative process than he had been in the past. The paper also criticized the legislature for failing to take action on two critical issues, instead referring them to popular vote.

Sessions 
Oregon is one of only six states where the legislature meets only once every two years. The Public Commission on the Oregon Legislature, established during the prior legislative session, recommended that the state move to annual sessions after 2009. In preparation for that change, the legislature scheduled a session for 2008. This was technically a special session, but lawmakers referred to it as a supplemental session to the 2007 session.

The 2007 regular session lasted 172 days, and the 2008 session was scheduled for February 4–29, but was adjourned February 22, for a total of 19 days. During the 2007 portion of the session, a total of 2,744 bills were introduced, with 910 passing and becoming Oregon law.

Both chambers took measures to limit the number of bills introduced in the 2008 session; the Senate limited individual members to introducing a single bill, and the House permitted only committee-sponsored bills.

The Oregon Constitution dictates that the legislature must meet only in biennial regular sessions, and that special sessions must be held only in response to a specific emergency. Senator Larry George sought an injunction based on this law. The Marion County Circuit Court judge who considered the case agreed that there were some concerns, but determined that the session was legal.

Bills

2007 regular session 
The Healthy Oregon Act (Senate Bill 329) was passed. Proposed by the Senate Commission on Health Care Access & Affordability (co-chaired by Alan Bates and Ben Westlund), the act also included amendments promoted by former governor John Kitzhaber and the Archimedes Movement. It is intended to lay a foundation for lower costs, improved quality of health care, and availability of low-cost health insurance for all Oregonians. (Senate Bill 27 of 2007, known as Oregon Better Health Act and promoted by the Archimedes Movement, did not pass.)

The legislature passed two LGBT rights bills: the Oregon Equality Act, banning discrimination based on sexual orientation and gender identity, and the Oregon Family Fairness Act, creating domestic partnerships for same-sex couples.

Updated ethics rules, which increased the financial disclosure requirements on local officials and commission members, proved controversial; 239 officials around the state resigned their positions the following April, when the rules took effect. Legislators and Governor Kulongoski are exploring ways to reform the ethics rules in the 2009 session.

The state ethics commission was allocated funds to hire an investigator and a trainer, and its budget will no longer be overseen by the legislature.

A new law will eliminate the "worst" junk food from public school vending machines and cafeterias.

The legislature established a rainy-day fund, but did not raise the corporate minimum tax, which the Statesman Journal called "absurdly low."

The legislature passed several new protections against identify theft.

The legislature allocated $33.5 million to offices and parking facilities at the Oregon State Capitol.

A modification to the Oregon Bottle Bill, adding water bottles to the list of containers with mandatory deposits, was passed. This was the first modification to the Bottle Bill since it was first passed in 1971. The legislature also formed a task force that will explore further modifications to the bill.

Funding for legislative staffing between sessions was doubled from the $4.2 million previously allocated.

Starting in January 2009, smoking will no longer be permitted in most bars.

Drivers under age 18 may be fined for talking on cell phones.

Three million dollars were allocated to Oregon Public Broadcasting to upgrade equipment serving rural areas.

The Register-Guard praised the legislature for increasing funding for higher education.

The Bend Bulletin criticized the legislature for failing to pass mandatory audits for local school districts, a measure advocated by the Chalkboard Project, which works for education policy reform.

The legislature referred two bills to popular vote: Measure 49 that amends 2004's Measure 37, which had limited land use regulation, and Measure 50 which would have increased the tobacco tax to provide health insurance for children.

2008 supplemental session 

The supplemental, or special, session of 2008 opened with little fanfare in the Senate, but with charges of partisan gamesmanship in the House. The legislature was criticized for preparing bills in secrecy, without posting draft legislation on its web site. Senate President Peter Courtney expressed satisfaction with the session's work, citing laws benefitting senior citizens, children in foster care, people with disabilities, and patients at the Oregon State Hospital.

During the special session, lawmakers established a tax force to explore ways to reform Oregon's medical liability limits, in response to a December 2007 Oregon Supreme Court ruling. The task force will be headed by Senator Floyd Prozanski and Representative Suzanne Bonamici.

A bill seeking to limit the use of medical marijuana in the workplace met with opposition from Associated Oregon Industries and The Oregonian's editorial board, and was not passed.

The legislature passed a law requiring proof of residence in order to obtain an Oregon drivers license, in order to comply with the Federal Real ID law. The legislature was criticized, however, for failing to take on an idea, previously advanced by Governor Kulongoski, to provide for an alternate "driving only" card.

The legislature referred a bill to voters, a toned-down alternative to a Kevin Mannix-backed bill establishing mandatory minimum sentences for property crimes.

Three bills passed by the legislature related to land use, including restoring funding for the Big Look Task Force, and addressing funding in light of the passage of Measure 49.

Senate members 

The Oregon State Senate, which had been controlled by Democrats since 2005, had a Democratic majority ranging between 17 and 19 of its 30 members during the 2007 and 2008 sessions (due to the party changes of two senators).

Senate President: Peter Courtney (D-11 Salem) 
President Pro Tem: Margaret Carter (D-22 Portland)
Majority Leader: Kate Brown (D-21 Portland) (2007 session), Richard Devlin (D-19 Tualatin) (2008 session)
Minority Leader: Ted Ferrioli (R-30 John Day)

<div style="float:left;text-align:left;padding-right:15px">

House members 

The Oregon House of Representatives had a Democratic majority of 31-29 during the 2007 and 2008 sessions. The narrow majority did not allow Democrats to pass any tax increases, due to the state's supermajority requirement.

Speaker: Jeff Merkley (D-47 Portland)
Speaker Pro Tem: Diane Rosenbaum (D-42 Portland)
Majority Leader: Dave Hunt (D-40 Clackamas County)
Majority Whip: Phil Barnhart (D-11 Linn/Lane)
Republican Minority Leader: Wayne Scott (R-39 Oregon City), then Bruce Hanna
Deputy Republican Leader: Bruce Hanna (R-7 Roseburg)
Republican Whip: Dennis Richardson (R-4 Central Point)
Deputy Republican Whip: Gene Whisnant (R-53 Sunriver)

See also 
 Seventy-third Oregon Legislative Assembly
 Oregon's statewide elections, 2006
 Oregon legislative elections, 2008

References

External links 
 of regular legislative sessions from Oregon Blue Book
 Chronology of special legislative sessions from Blue Book
 List of members of 2007 session from Oregon State Archives
 Committee assignments, 2007–2008 interim, from oregonlive.com. (August 14, 2007)
 Committee assignments
 Official summary of bills considered in the 2007 regular session
 Official summary of bills considered in the 2008 special session

Oregon legislative sessions
2008 U.S. legislative sessions
2007 U.S. legislative sessions
2007 in Oregon
2008 in Oregon